Gina McWilliams (born July 16, 1975) is a former American Paralympic volleyballer.

Competition
McWilliams started competing for Paralympic Games in 2003 where she won a gold medal for her participation at Parapan American Games in Mar del Plata, Argentina. In 2004, she participated in 2004 Paralympic Games which were held in Athens, Greece and where she got her first bronze medal. In 2008 she participated at World Organization Volleyball for Disabled which was held at Ismaïlia, Egypt and where McWilliams got second bronze. In 2008 Paralympics which were held in Beijing, China she won a silver medal for Women's Sitting Volleyball. In 2010, she won one more silver medal for Sitting Volleyball World Championships.

Personal life
McWilliams is married and had two children. She resides in Carrollton, Texas.

References

External links
 
 

Paralympic volleyball players of the United States
Paralympic bronze medalists for the United States
Living people
1975 births
Medalists at the 2004 Summer Paralympics
Medalists at the 2008 Summer Paralympics
Paralympic silver medalists for the United States
Volleyball players at the 2004 Summer Paralympics
Volleyball players at the 2008 Summer Paralympics
Paralympic medalists in volleyball